Erol Erdal Alkan (born 16 February 1994) is a professional footballer who plays as a centre back for Belgian club FC Esperanza Pelt. Born in the Netherlands, he has represented Turkey at youth international level

Club career
Alkan made his Süper Lig debut on 26 January 2014.

On 7 July 2018, he signed with Bulgarian club Beroe. He established himself as a starter, but parted ways with the team by mutual consent in January 2020.

After leaving Beroe, Alkan earned a trial at Wycombe Wanderers and appeared against Hungerford Town in the Berks & Bucks Senior Cup, but was not offered a contract by the EFL League One club. On 1 July 2020, he signed with Türkgücü München, newly promoted to the German 3. Liga.

On 23 January 2022, it was announced that Alkan had signed for League of Ireland Premier Division club Finn Harps. After 7 appearances for the club, it was announced on 28 July 2022 that he was one of 4 players departing Finn Harps, with Alkan joining Belgian club FC Esperanza Pelt.

International career
Alkan was born in the Netherlands to a Surinamese mother and Turkish father. He chose to represent Turkey at the international level and made his debut with the Turkey U21s against his birth country, the Netherlands.

References

External links
 
 

1994 births
Living people
Footballers from Amsterdam
Citizens of Turkey through descent
Turkish footballers
Turkey under-21 international footballers
Dutch footballers
Turkish people of Surinamese descent
Sportspeople of Surinamese descent
Dutch sportspeople of Surinamese descent
Dutch people of Turkish descent
Association football central defenders
A.V.V. Zeeburgia players
AFC Ajax players
SC Heerenveen players
İstanbul Başakşehir F.K. players
Elazığspor footballers
Hatayspor footballers
FC Dordrecht players
PFC Beroe Stara Zagora players
Türkgücü München players
SFC Etar Veliko Tarnovo players
Finn Harps F.C. players
League of Ireland players
Süper Lig players
TFF Second League players
Eerste Divisie players
First Professional Football League (Bulgaria) players
Turkish expatriate footballers
Dutch expatriate footballers
Turkish expatriate sportspeople in Germany
Dutch expatriate sportspeople in Germany
Expatriate footballers in Germany
Dutch expatriate sportspeople in Bulgaria
Expatriate footballers in Bulgaria
Expatriate association footballers in the Republic of Ireland
Turkish expatriate sportspeople in Ireland
Dutch expatriate sportspeople in Ireland